The Verucini were a Gallic tribe dwelling in the inlands of southeastern Provence during the Iron Age.

Name 

The Verucini are solely attested by Pliny as Verucini in the 1st century AD.

The ethnonym Verucini is latinized form of Gaulish Uerucinoi (sg. Uerucinos). It derives from the stem ueru- ('large'), and is related to the personal names Ueru-cloetius, Ueru-clonis, Ueruccius, and Ueruco.

Geography 

Pliny describes the territory of the Verucini as situated near the Suelteri (Saint-Tropez). They appear to have lived between the Argens and Verdon rivers, near modern Draguignan, Salernes, and Aups. A deus Mars Veracinius is attested in the Adon pass (Les Mujouls). It was probably the protector deity of the Verucini, and perhaps also that of the travellers to this mountainous region.

References

Bibliography 

 
 
 

Gauls
Tribes of pre-Roman Gaul
Historical Celtic peoples